Arotrophora hongsona is a species of moth of the family Tortricidae. It is found in Thailand.

The wingspan is about 14 mm. The ground colour of the basal part of the forewings is cream, suffused with brownish and grey. The posterior part of the wing is grey with dark grey reticulation (a net-like pattern) and strigulation (fine streaks), a whitish-grey spot on the costa. The hindwings are pale brownish grey.

Etymology
The species name refers to Mae Hong Son, Pai District, the type locality.

References

Moths described in 2009
Arotrophora
Moths of Asia